Resolven is and electoral ward of Neath Port Talbot county borough, Wales.  Resolven is made up of the parishes of Resolven and Clyne and Melincourt.

Resolven includes some or all of the settlements of Resolven and Clyne in the parliamentary constituency of Neath.  The ward consists of steep wooded hills to the northwest and north east with undeveloped moorland to the south.  It is cut through the middle by the Neath Valley which is traversed by the A465 'Heads of Valleys' road.

Resolven is bounded by the wards of Glynneath to the north; Blaengwrach to the northeast; Glyncorrwg to the east; Cymmer to the southeast; Pelenna to the south; Tonna to the southwest; Aberdulais to the west; and Crynant to the northwest.

In the 2017 local council elections, the electorate turnout was %.  The results were:

In February 2019, Resolven councillor Des Davies died and hence the 2019 Resolven council by-election took place on May 23, 2019. The results were:

References 

Electoral wards of Neath Port Talbot